Vivox Inc. is an American communications company that manages communication services in the form of integrated voice chat, Instant Messaging (IM) to online games, virtual worlds and other online communities. It is headquartered in Framingham, Massachusetts.

History
Vivox was founded by Jeff Pulver in 2005. On September 19, 2005, Vivox announced they had received $6 million in venture capital funding from Canaan Partners and GrandBanks Capital.

On November 13, 2007, Vivox announced they had secured $7.8 million in Series B financing. This funding was led by Benchmark Capital and supported by existing investors Canaan Partners and GrandBanks Capital. With the support of Benchmark Capital, former CEO of JAMDAT Mobile, Mitch Lasky, was added to the Vivox board of directors. 

On February 2, 2010, Vivox announced that they had raised $6.8 Million in funding for their Series C funding. The round was led by IDG Ventures and included follow-on investments from existing investors, Benchmark Capital, Canaan Partners and GrandBanks Capital. In addition, IDG Ventures managing director Phil Sanderson joined the Vivox Board.

On January 29, 2019, Unity acquired Vivox for an undisclosed amount.

Major announcements
On May 10, 2006, CCP Games and Vivox announced that EVE Online players would have real-time, in-game voice communication as the result of an agreement between the two companies. Vivox provided CCP with an integrated solution that allows players to speak with each other in-game, and create audio conference channels for their gang, corporation or alliance.

On February 27, 2007, Vivox announced a partnership with Linden Lab and that they would provide integrated voice communications to the Second Life Grid. This included spatial audio that allows residents to hear each other based on their positions. This technology was licensed by DiamondWare Technologies.

During the 2008 Game Developers Conference in San Francisco, California, Vivox announced a partnership with Sony Online Entertainment. The agreement between the two companies brought integrated voice chat into all existing and planned SOE products including SOE's out of game communication application, Station Launcher. SOE games that use Vivox Voice include EverQuest, APB, EverQuest 2, Star Wars Galaxies, and Planetside 2.

On May 13, 2008, Vivox and NCsoft announced a partnership that would bring voice to the NCsoft player community.

On September 16, 2008, it was announced that Vivox would provide voice technology for 38 Studios' upcoming MMO.

On March 24, 2009, Vivox and Real Time Worlds declared that Vivox would provide a voice for Real Time Worlds' MMO, APB. Vivox's spatial 3D voice technology was also included within the game.

Vivox provided its software for Epic Games' Fortnite Battle Royale on the Nintendo Switch (Vivox was already used by the game across other platforms), which otherwise lacked a voice chat function without using the Nintendo Switch Online companion phone app. Vivox's software provided a direct voice chat solution (not requiring the mobile app) that also supports cross-platform communications. Vivox announced in February 2019 it will provide its software development kit for Switch voice chat so that other games can take advantage of this approach.

Controversy

Vivox has encountered backlash from the Linux community for encouraging game developers to drop Linux support, rather than making their software compatible with Linux. A developer for Alderon Games, working on the MMO dinosaur game Path of Titans, received this reply from Vivox when they asked about paying them to add Linux support:

Integrations

Online games and virtual worlds

Known integrations of Vivox's communications platform in online games and virtual worlds.

Middleware platforms
Known middleware integrations of Vivox's communications platform.

Other products

C3 - Command, Control, Communicate 
C3 is a standalone voice-over-Internet-Protocol (VoIP) client where computer users are able to connect and speak with fellow computer users. C3 allows users to chat both through text and voice by creating chat channels with a maximum capacity of 100 users in each channel.

The target audience of C3 is gamers who can use the software to communicate with other gamers among the same guild, team, clan, etc. on an online multiplayer game (MMO). Voice communication allows for players to use teamwork to their advantage while creating a sense of online community.

See also
Ventrilo
TeamSpeak
Roger Wilco
Mumble

References

External links

Companies established in 2005
VoIP companies of the United States